The 2003 Proximus 24 Spa was the 56th running of the Spa 24 Hours and the sixth round the 2003 FIA GT Championship.  This event combined the FIA GT's two classes (GT and N-GT) with cars from national series and one-make series, designated G2 and G3.  It took place at the Circuit de Spa-Francorchamps, Belgium, on 25 and 26 July 2003.

This race marked the only time in the history of the FIA GT Championship that the slower of the two classes (N-GT in this case) managed to win a race overall.

Half-point leaders
For the FIA GT Championship, the top eight cars in the GT and N-GT classes are awarded half points for their positions after six hours and twelve hours into the race.  Points to the top eight were awarded in the order of 4.0 – 3.0 – 2.5 – 2.0 – 1.5 – 1.0 – 0.5.

6 Hour leaders in GT

6 Hour leaders in N-GT

12 Hour leaders in GT

12 Hour leaders in N-GT

Official results
Class winners in bold.  Cars failing to complete 70% of winner's distance marked as Not Classified (NC).

Statistics
 Pole position – #22 BMS Scuderia Italia – 2:15.718
 Fastest lap – #14 Lister Racing – 2:19.453
 Distance – 3327.613 km
 Average speed – 138.557 km/h

References

 
 
 

S
Spa
Spa 24 Hours